The Sudamericano de Futsal Sub-20 (South American Under-20 Futsal Championship), is the U-20 version of Copa América de Futsal.

Champions by year

Medal Count

References

 source: http://www.futsalplanet.com/agenda/agenda-01.asp?id=20319 - all detail results

External links
Sudamericano Sub 20 de Futsal Uruguay 2016

Futsal competitions in South America
CONMEBOL competitions
South American youth sports competitions